Brushy Creek is a stream in Clay County in the U.S. state of Missouri. It is a tributary of the Fishing River.

Brushy Creek was so named on account of brush lining its banks.

See also
List of rivers of Missouri

References

Rivers of Clay County, Missouri
Rivers of Missouri